Thalamencephalon, also called thalamic region or thalamic complex is a complex structure comprising thalamus (in the wider sense of the term thalamus, i.e. dorsal thalamus, or thalamus proper, plus subthalamus, or ventral thalamus) and several adjacent structures: epithalamus and metathalamus.

The thalamencephalon is phylogenetically younger part of the diencephalon than the hypothalamus and neurohypophysis, which are not considered to belong to the thalamencephalon.

References